VIA LongHaul is a CPU speed throttling and  power saving technology developed by VIA Technologies. By executing specialized instructions, software can exercise fine control on the bus-to-core frequency ratio and CPU core voltage. When the system first boots, the ratio and voltage are set to hardware defaults. While the operating system runs, a CPU driver controls the throttling according to how much load is put on the CPU.

This fine control over the CPU's operating parameters brings LongHaul in contrast to other competing technologies, where a CPU is typically allowed to switch between only two states - one that is fast but power-consuming and one that is slow but uses less power. However LongHaul is considered similar to Transmeta's LongRun technology.

There are 3 versions of LongHaul:
 Version 1 only supports dynamic frequency scaling and is implemented in the Cyrix III Samuel (C5A) core and C3 Samuel 2 (C5B) stepping 0 core.
 Version 2 adds voltage scaling and is implemented in the C3 Samuel 2 (C5B) stepping 1-7 and Ezra (C5C) cores.
 Version 3 was renamed to PowerSaver and is implemented in the C3 Ezra-T (C5N) and Nehemiah cores as well as the C7 Esther (C5J) core. Some variants of the C7-D do not support PowerSaver.

Processors supporting LongHaul
 Cyrix III - some models 
 VIA C3
 VIA C7 (PowerSaver)
 VIA Nano (PowerSaver)

External links
VIA C3 in EBGA Datasheet
Tom's Computer Dictionary - LongHaul entry

Computer hardware tuning
Clock signal
VIA Technologies